Lectionary 271, designated by siglum ℓ 271 (in the Gregory-Aland numbering) is a Greek manuscript of the New Testament, on paper. Palaeographically it has been assigned to the 17th century.
Scrivener labelled it as 177e,
Gregory by 271e. Formerly it was known as Nanianus 222. The manuscript has survived in a fragmentary condition.

Description 

The codex contains some lessons from the Gospel of Matthew (Evangelistarium).

The text is written in Greek minuscule letters, on 11 paper leaves, in one column per page, 23-24 lines per page. Scrivener described the manuscript as "eleven poor leanes".

History 

Scrivener dated the manuscript to the 15th century, Gregory dated it to the 17th century. It is presently assigned by the INTF to the 17th century.

The manuscript was added to the list of New Testament manuscripts by Scrivener (number 177e) and Gregory (number 271e). Gregory saw the manuscript in 1886.

The manuscript is not cited in the critical editions of the Greek New Testament (UBS3).

Currently the codex is housed at the Biblioteca Marciana (Gr. I.51 (1419)) in Venice.

See also 

 List of New Testament lectionaries
 Biblical manuscript
 Textual criticism
 Lectionary 270

Notes and references

Bibliography 

 

Greek New Testament lectionaries
17th-century biblical manuscripts